Charlotte Lichtman (born March 26, 1993 in Detroit) is an American former competitive ice dancer. With former partner Dean Copely, she is the 2011 World Junior bronze medalist and U.S. Junior champion.

Career 
Charlotte Lichtman began skating in 1999. She was a singles skater until the age of 14 and competed up to the novice level. She teamed up with Dean Copely after the 2008 Lake Placid Ice Dancing Championships. They trained in Canton, Michigan with Igor Shpilband and Marina Zueva. They began competing on the ISU Junior Grand Prix series during the 2009–10 season.

Lichtman and Copely won gold and bronze medals on the 2010–2011 ISU Junior Grand Prix series, and qualified for the JGP Final where they finished 5th. They won the U.S. Junior Championships. At Junior Worlds they won a bronze medal.

Lichtman and Copely announced the end of their partnership on April 27, 2012.

Programs 
(with Copely)

Competitive highlights 
(with Copely)

References

External links 

 
 Charlotte Lichtman / Dean Copely at Icenetwork

American female ice dancers
1993 births
Living people
Figure skaters from Detroit
World Junior Figure Skating Championships medalists
21st-century American women